"Drunk (And I Don't Wanna Go Home)" is a song by American singers Elle King and Miranda Lambert. It was released on February 26, 2021 as the lead single from King's third studio album Come Get Your Wife. The song reached number one on the Country Airplay chart in April 2022, becoming the first female duet to reach the top of the charts in almost thirty years following Reba McEntire and Linda Davis' "Does He Love You" in 1993.

The song was nominated for the Grammy Award for Best Country Duo/Group Performance, the Country Music Association Award for Musical Event of the Year and won the Academy of Country Music Award for Video of the Year.

Background and composition
Miranda Lambert teased the song on social media on February 23, 2021.  The song was recorded prior to the COVID-19 pandemic in both Nashville and New York.  Rolling Stone described the song as a "neon-spattered, banjo-flecked euphoria that fits perfectly with the idea of blowing off steam well into the wee hours".

King and Lambert performed the song live for the first time when they opened the 56th Academy of Country Music Awards on April 18, 2021.

Personnel
Credits adapted from Tidal.
 Elle King – vocals, songwriting, lyrics, background vocals
 Miranda Lambert – vocals, background vocals
 Martin Johnson – songwriting, lyrics, production, acoustic guitar, background vocals, electric guitar, piano, synthesizer
 Brandon Paddock – production, background vocals, engineering, percussion, programming, synthesizer
 Abby Cahours – background vocals
 Naomi Cahours – background vocals
 Sean Hurley – bass
 Tyler Chiarelli – dobro, electric guitar
 Rob Humphreys – drums
 Kyle Moorman – engineering, miscellaneous production, programming
 Ted Jensen – mastering engineer
 Jeff Braun – mixing engineer

Charts

Weekly charts

Year-end charts

Certifications

Release history

References

2021 songs
2021 singles
Elle King songs
Miranda Lambert songs
RCA Records singles
Songs written by Martin Johnson (musician)
Female vocal duets